Robert Cameron Broomfield (June 18, 1933 – July 10, 2014) was a United States district judge of the United States District Court for the District of Arizona.

Education and career

Born on June 18, 1933, in Detroit, Michigan, Broomfield earned a Bachelor of Science degree from Pennsylvania State University in 1955, and a Bachelor of Laws from James E. Rogers College of Law at the University of Arizona in 1961. From 1955 to 1958, Broomfield was a United States Air Force Lieutenant, and an Air Force Reserve Captain from 1961 to 1972. He served as a clerk and bailiff to Judge Jack D. H. Hays of the Superior Court of Arizona from 1961 to 1962. He was in private practice in Phoenix, Arizona from 1962 to 1970. He was a Judge of the Superior Court of Arizona from 1971 to 1985, serving as Presiding Judge of the Juvenile Division from 1972 to 1974 and serving as Presiding Judge of the court from 1974 to 1985.

Federal judicial service

Broomfield was nominated by President Ronald Reagan on May 15, 1985, to the United States District Court for the District of Arizona, to a new seat authorized by 71 Stat. 586. He was confirmed by the United States Senate on July 10, 1985, and received commission on July 11, 1985. He served as Chief Judge from 1994 to 1999. He assumed senior status on August 12, 1999. His service terminated on July 10, 2014, due to death.

Chief Justice William Rehnquist appointed Broomfield to the Foreign Intelligence Surveillance Court in May 2002, a position in which he served until 2009. Rehnquist also appointed him to the Budget Committee in 1997, and he served as a member until 2013.

Death

Broomfield died of cancer in a Phoenix hospice on July 10, 2014, exactly 29 years from the date he was commissioned as a federal judge.

Accomplishment and honor

Broomfield was influential in obtaining approval for and funding of the Sandra Day O'Connor United States Courthouse in Phoenix.

His former colleagues held a memorial service in his honor at the District Court of Arizona on July 23, 2014.

References

External links
 

1933 births
2014 deaths
Lawyers from Detroit
Pennsylvania State University alumni
James E. Rogers College of Law alumni
United States Air Force officers
Judges of the United States District Court for the District of Arizona
United States district court judges appointed by Ronald Reagan
20th-century American judges
Superior court judges in the United States
Judges of the United States Foreign Intelligence Surveillance Court